is one of 24 wards which make up the city of Osaka, and is located in the southeast of the city. It is the largest Osaka ward in population and the only ward to have over 200,000 residents.

Geography

The north-west side of Hirano-ku is on the southern part of the Uemachi Plateau, but the overall terrain is mostly flat. The Yamato River flows through the south of the ward, and the Uriwari Cemetery is located inside the ward.

History

The name Hirano probably goes back to the end of the Heian period, and was formally known as Hirano-shou in Sumiyoshi-gun (district) of the Settsu province. The second son of Sakanoue no Tamuramaro, Sakanoue no Hirono, was the feudal lord in charge of the development of Hirano and was called Hirano-tono (tono being the title given to noblemen).

There are a couple of theories as to the origin of the name Hirano. One is that it is a corruption or mispronunciation of the word kouya (広野). Another theory is that it comes from the time when many lakes and marshes were reclaimed and the fields (野) were widened (平らになった) making the kanji combination 平野.

Transportation

Train
West Japan Railway Company (JR West)
 Kansai Main Line: Kami Station - Hirano Station
 Osaka Higashi Line: Shin-Kami Station

Osaka Metro
 Tanimachi Line: Hirano Station - Kire-Uriwari Station - Deto Station - Nagahara Station

Education

Universities and colleges 

 Tokiwakai Gakuen University
 Tokiwakai College

Religion 

 Dainenbutsu-ji
 Senkō-ji

Notable people
Akihiro Yano, Professional baseball player
Daishōmaru Shōgo, sumo wrestler
Shōfukutei Tsurube II, rakugo comedian and actor
Satoshi Matsuda, actor
Yuki Matsuoka, voice actress
Masami Hisamoto, Talent
Lee Myung-bak, President of South Korea
ManaKana, twin actresses
Ai Haruna, Transsexual television actor

External links

Official website of Hirano 

 
Wards of Osaka